The Wicked Carabel (Spanish: El malvado Carabel) is a 1935 Spanish comedy film directed by Edgar Neville and starring Antoñita Colomé and Antonio Vico. It was based on a novel by Wenceslao Fernández Flórez.

Cast

References

Bibliography

External links 

1935 films
Films based on Spanish novels
Spanish comedy films
1935 comedy films
1930s Spanish-language films
Films directed by Edgar Neville
Spanish black-and-white films